Coast Lake is a small lake at Cape Royds, Ross Island in the Antarctic region, lying close to the coastline, about  north of Flagstaff Point. It was named by the British Antarctic Expedition, 1907–09, because of its position. The lake is being considered as a staging area for an expedition by flat earthers who are attempting to prove Antarctica is an ice wall which is the edge of a flat earth.

References 

Lakes of Ross Island